Disney Magic is a cruise ship owned and operated by Disney Cruise Line, a subsidiary of The Walt Disney Company. Its first vessel, she has 11 public decks, can accommodate 2,700 passengers in 875 staterooms, and has a crew of approximately 950. The interior of Disney Magic is decorated in the Art Deco style. The four other ships are the Disney Wonder, Disney Dream, Disney Fantasy, and Disney Wish.

The ship has 20 bright yellow lifeboats which, along with the black, red, and white colors of the ship itself, match the colors of Mickey Mouse. This change from the standard safety orange took a waiver of international maritime rules. As with other Disney cruise ships, the ship's horn blast plays a snippet of '"When You Wish upon a Star". Disney Magics "godmother" is Patricia Disney, former wife of Walt Disney's nephew, Roy E. Disney.

History

Planning and construction 
Disney had cruise ship designs drawn up by February 1994. Disney Cruise Line in 1995 ordered Disney Magic and Disney Wonder from Fincantieri in Italy. The ship was built in two halves with the bow built at Fincatieri's Ancona shipyard and the stern at their Marghera shipyard.

The planned maiden voyage was for March 12, 1998. In January 1997, the first ticket for Magic's first trip was raffled off on Lifetime channel, while ticket sales would begin in September 1997. Delays on the construction of MS Rotterdam kept additional workers from the Magic. Thus, by November 1997, the cruise line initially rescheduled the ship's initial voyage to April 30, 1998. However, further delays from suppliers and poor weather conditions at Fincantieri pushed back the maiden voyage even further by a few months. The bow was towed to the Marghera shipyard where the halves were joined.

Itineraries 
With livery and design evocative of the RMS Queen Mary, Disney Magic set sail on her maiden voyage on July 30, 1998, out of Port Canaveral. The ship's initial cruises were to Nassau, Bahamas with a stop at Castaway Cay over three to four nights.

Originally, from 2000, Disney Magic had been undertaking weekly cruises to Castaway Cay and Caribbean islands out of its home port in Port Canaveral, Florida. 

In June 2005, Disney Magic was dispatched to the West Coast as part of Disneyland's 50th Anniversary celebrations and as a test for California expansion. The transfer cruise sold out quicker than expected. Bookings from first time Disney cruisers were up for these cruises by at least 60%.

In May 2007, Disney Magic started her inaugural Mediterranean cruises out of Barcelona, Spain. At the end of the summer, she returned to her home port of Port Canaveral. In the summer of 2008, Disney Magic was moved to Los Angeles once again. The ship returned to Barcelona in 2010 for another summer of Mediterranean cruises, as well as several northern European cruises before again returning to Port Canaveral in September.

In May 2012, Disney Magic was relocated to New York City, where she sailed 8-night cruises to the Bahamas, New England, and Canada. In September, she was relocated to Galveston, Texas for the remainder of the year and offered 4-night Caribbean cruises, 6, 7, and 8-night Western Caribbean cruises, and 8-night Bahamian cruises. In June 2013, Disney Magic was re-positioned to Barcelona, Spain for the summer. 

Disney Magic was put in for an overhaul at Navantia shipyard, Cadiz, Spain. In October 2013, Disney Cruise Line completed renovations to Disney Magic  including updates to the ship's cabins, lounges, restaurants and spa and introduced new features including; "Marvel's Avengers Academy", a play area based on Marvel's Avengers characters, the AquaDunk and the AquaLab, consisting of a pool and waterslide. The short lived Carioca's restaurant replaced Parrot Cay, which would later be replaced with Rapunzel's Royal Table in 2018. Club Disney Junior replaced the Mickey Mouse Club and other changes were made.

In 2016, the Disney Magic sailed Disney Cruise Lines' inaugural Northern Europe itineraries, homeported in the port of Dover, 70 miles from London, England. She sailed to Norway, the British Isles, and the Baltic Sea during her brief three month season. With the October 6, 2017 cruise of Disney Magic from New York to the Bahamas, the cruise line held its first Marvel Day at Sea.

During the COVID-19 pandemic, Disney Magic was anchored in Dover on and off from May 2020 and was due to stay until at least August 2021. At that time, she sailed a series of "staycation cruises" (no port visits or excursions, subject to restrictions) exclusively in the United Kingdom. UK cruises concluded on October 4, 2021, when Disney Magic repositioned to Miami, Florida and commenced cruises to The Bahamas. Then, in the summer of 2022, she returned to Europe for European cruises before returning to the US for the fall.

Recreation

Entertainment 
Entertainment on Disney Magic includes live Broadway-style shows with many Disney characters at the Walt Disney Theater, the Buena Vista movie theater, which features both Disney films and first-run movies, several night clubs and lounges, several pools, and many Disney-themed parties and celebrations, including a Sail-Away Celebration, Pirate Night, and sometimes a Marvel or Star Wars Day at Sea.

On the ship's forward funnel, there is a 24-by-14 foot LED screen known as the Funnel Vision, due to its location on the rear of one of the ship's funnels, where guests can watch various movies and shows either from the deck or from inside Goofy's Pool.

Shows from the Walt Disney Theatre may include: All Aboard, Let The Magic Begin, A Final Farewell Show, Twice Charmed: A Twist on the Cinderella Story, Tangled the Musical and Disney Dreams: An Enchanted Classic.  Former shows included 'Villains Tonight!' which was replaced by Tangled.

Dining 
Disney Cruise line is known for pioneering the rotational dining setup, in which guests and their wait staff rotate through three differently themed restaurants throughout their cruise. The Disney Magic's restaurants include Lumiere's (serving primarily French Cuisine), Rapunzel's Royal Table (serving German-inspired food), and Animator's Palate (which is present on four of the other Disney cruise ships). Additionally, the upscale, adults-only restaurant Palo, situated at the rear of the ship, requires a separate reservation and serves high-end Italian cuisine.

References

External links 

 

Panamax cruise ships
Ships of Disney Cruise Line
Ships built by Fincantieri
Ships built in Venice
1998 ships